The 2006 Supercoppa Italiana was a match contested by the 2005–06 Serie A winners Internazionale and the 2005–06 Coppa Italia runners-up Roma. While Juventus were originally the first-placed team in Serie A, the title was put sub judice due to their involvement in the Calciopoli scandal, with Internazionale instead declared champions by the Italian Football Federation (FIGC) on 26 July 2006.

The match resulted in a 4–3 win for Inter after extra time.

Match details

References

2006
Supercoppa 2006
Supercoppa 2006
Supercoppa Italiana
August 2006 sports events in Europe